Diving In is a 1990 American film directed by Strathford Hamilton and starring Matt Adler.

Plot summary
Wayne Hopkins, a high school diver afraid of heights, enlists the help of a former women's Olympic coach.

Cast
 Matt Adler as Wayne Hopkins
 Kristy Swanson as Terry Hopkins
 Burt Young as Coach Mack
 Matt Lattanzi as Jerome Colter
 Yolanda Jilot as Amanda Lanski
 Richard Johnson as Richard Anthony
 Carey Scott as Ryes Wallstien
 John E. Blazier as Car Driver/Food Patron

External links
 
 

1990 films
1990 drama films
American sports drama films
Diving films
Films set in Indiana
Films shot in Indiana
1990s English-language films
Films directed by Strathford Hamilton
Films scored by Guy Moon
1990s American films